The Kings of the Beats is an album by Luny Tunes to showcase their production mastery. The two-disc, 43-track album rounds up instrumental versions of many of the duo's most popular work, along with other production shorts exclusive to this album. It was nominated for Latin Grammy Award for Best Urban Music Album at the 2005 award ceremony.

Track listing
Disc 1
"Introduction"  (2:10) LUNY TUMES
"Rap: Beat"  (3:52)
"Reggaeton: Beat 1"  (2:34)
"Reggaeton: Beat 2"  (2:27)
"Reggaeton: Beat 3"  (2:32)
"Reggaeton: Beat 4"  (2:27)
"Merengue Beat"  (2:32)
"Bachata: Beat"  (3:35)
"Reggaeton: Beat 5"  (3:03)
"Bolero: Beat"  (2:59)- Baby Ranks
"Reggaeton: Beat 6"  (2:55)
"Agárrala: Beat"  (4:25)- Don Omar, Hector "El Father", & Trebol Clan
"Valla: Beat"  (2:32)
"No Le Temas a Él: Beat"  (3:35)- Trebol Clan, Hector & Tito
"Ho He Ho He: Beat"  (3:21) JOAN & ONELI
"Te Buscaré: Beat"  (2:39)- Tito "El Bambino"
"Zion & Lennox Concert Jingle: Beat"  (3:03)- Zion & Lennox
"Gasolina: Beat"  (3:16)- Daddy Yankee
"Amor: Beat"  (3:20)- Baby Ranks
"Bumper: Beat"  (3:33)- Voltio
"Tú Quieres Duro: Beat"  (3:31)- Hector "El Father"
"Noche de Travesura: Beat"  (3:30)- Hector "El Father" & Divino
"Tu Príncipe: Beat"  (3:25)- Daddy Yankee, Zion & Lennox
Disc 2     
"La Calle Lo Pidió: Beat"  yandel
(3:05)- Yandel & Tego Calderón
"Rolo: Beat"  (2:43)- Alexis & Fido
"Al Natural: Beat"  (2:15)- Tego Calderón
"Amor de Colegio: Beat"  (3:30)- Don Omar, Hector & Tito
"Te Entregas a Mí: Beat"  (3:19)- Baby Rasta & Gringo
"Baila Morena: Beat"  (3:15)- Hector & Tito, Don Omar
"Santífica: Beat"  (3:25)- Daddy Yankee
"Entre Tú y Yo: Beat"  (3:07)- Don Omar
"Sin Jockey: Beat"  (3:16)- Daddy Yankee
"Cae La Noche: Beat"  (3:12) Don Omar
"Say Ho: Beat"  (3:12)- Wisin & Yandel
"Toda la Noche: Beat"  (2:45)
"Mambo Duro: Beat"  (3:39)- Tego Calderón
"Tú Piensas en Mí: Beat"  (1:56)- Eddie Dee & Daddy Yankee
"Aunque Me Tiren: Beat"  (3:30)- Voltio & Tego Calderón
"Tu Cuerpo: Beat"  (2:27)- Yandel
"Búscame: Beat"  (2:25)- Yandel
"Vamos Perro: Beat" (3:01)- Angel & Khriz
"Ven a Bailar: Beat" (2:31)- Angel Doze
"Noche y Pelea: Beat"  (2:49)- Wisin

References

2004 compilation albums
Luny Tunes albums
Instrumental albums
Albums produced by Luny Tunes